The envelope (E) protein is the smallest and least well-characterized of the four major structural proteins found in coronavirus virions. It is an integral membrane protein less than 110 amino acid residues long; in SARS-CoV-2, the causative agent of Covid-19, the E protein is 75 residues long. Although it is not necessarily essential for viral replication, absence of the E protein may produce abnormally assembled viral capsids or reduced replication. E is a multifunctional protein and, in addition to its role as a structural protein in the viral capsid, it is thought to be involved in viral assembly, likely functions as a viroporin, and is involved in viral pathogenesis.

Structure 

The E protein consists of a short hydrophilic N-terminal region, a hydrophobic helical transmembrane domain, and a somewhat hydrophilic C-terminal region. In SARS-CoV and SARS-CoV-2, the C-terminal region contains a PDZ-binding motif (PBM). This feature appears to be conserved only in the alpha and beta coronavirus groups, but not gamma. In the beta and gamma groups, a conserved proline residue is found in the C-terminal region likely involved in targeting the protein to the Golgi.

The transmembrane helices of the E proteins of SARS-CoV and SARS-CoV-2 can oligomerize and have been shown in vitro to form pentameric structures with central pores that serve as cation-selective ion channels. Both viruses' E protein pentamers have been structurally characterized by nuclear magnetic resonance spectroscopy.

The membrane topology of the E protein has been studied in a number of coronaviruses with inconsistent results; the protein's orientation in the membrane may be variable. The balance of evidence suggests the most common orientation has the C-terminus oriented toward the cytoplasm. Studies of SARS-CoV-2 E protein are consistent with this orientation.

Post-translational modifications
In some, but not all, coronaviruses, the E protein is post-translationally modified by palmitoylation on conserved cysteine residues. In the SARS-CoV E protein, one glycosylation site has been observed, which may influence membrane topology; however, the functional significance of E glycosylation is unclear. Ubiquitination of SARS-CoV E has also been described, though its functional significance is also not known.

Expression and localization

The E protein is expressed at high abundance in infected cells. However, only a small amount of the total E protein produced is found in assembled virions. E protein is localized to the endoplasmic reticulum, Golgi apparatus, and endoplasmic-reticulum–Golgi intermediate compartment (ERGIC), the intracellular compartment that gives rise to the coronavirus viral envelope.

Function

Essentiality
Studies in different coronaviruses have reached different conclusions about whether E is essential to viral replication. In some coronaviruses, including MERS-CoV, E has been reported to be essential. In others, including mouse coronavirus and SARS-CoV, E is not essential, though its absence reduces viral titer, in some cases by introducing propagation defects or causing abnormal capsid morphology.

Virions and viral assembly

The E protein is found in assembled virions where it forms protein-protein interactions with the coronavirus membrane protein (M), the most abundant of the four structural proteins contained in the viral capsid. The interaction between E and M occurs through their respective C-termini on the cytoplasmic side of the membrane. In most coronaviruses, E and M are sufficient to form virus-like particles, though SARS-CoV has been reported to depend on N as well. There is good evidence that E is involved in inducing membrane curvature to create the typical spherical coronavirus virion. It is likely that E is involved in viral budding or scission, although its role in this process has not been well characterized.

Viroporin
In its pentameric state, E forms cation-selective ion channels and likely functions as a viroporin. This may disrupt ion homeostasis, alter membrane permeability, and modulate pH in the host cell, which may facilitate viral release. The E protein's role as a viroporin appears to be involved in pathogenesis and may be related to activation of the inflammasome. In SARS-CoV, mutations that disrupt E's ion channel function result in attenuated pathogenesis in animal models despite little effect on viral growth.

Interactions with host proteins

Protein-protein interactions between E and proteins in the host cell are best described in SARS-CoV and occur via the C-terminal PDZ domain binding motif. The SARS-CoV E protein has been reported to interact with five host cell proteins: Bcl-xL, PALS1, syntenin, sodium/potassium (Na+/K+) ATPase α-1 subunit, and stomatin. The interaction with PALS1 may be related to pathogenesis via the resulting disruption in tight junctions. This interaction has also been identified in SARS-CoV-2.

Evolution and conservation
The sequence of the E protein is not well conserved across coronavirus genera, with sequence identities reaching under 30%. In laboratory experiments on mouse hepatitis virus, substitution of E proteins from different coronaviruses, even from different groups, could produce viable viruses, suggesting that significant sequence diversity can be tolerated in functional E proteins. The SARS-CoV-2 E protein is very similar to that of SARS-CoV, with three substitutions and one deletion. A study of SARS-CoV-2 sequences suggests that the E protein is evolving relatively slowly compared to other structural proteins. The conserved nature of the envelope protein among SARS-CoV and SARS-CoV-2 variants has led it to be researched as a potential target for universal coronavirus vaccine development.

References 

Coronavirus proteins
Viral protein class
Viral structural proteins